The Charles Gill House is a historic house at 76 Pleasant Street in Stoneham, Massachusetts.  It is one of three well preserved Second Empire worker's cottages in Stoneham.  It was built c. 1860 for Charles Gill, a shoemaker.  The house as two stories, the upper one under a mansard roof, with single-window dormers topped by segmented-arches piercing the steeper roof line.  The house follows a basic side hall plan, except there is a projecting ell to the right, with a porch in the crook of the ell.

The house was listed on the National Register of Historic Places in 1984.

See also
National Register of Historic Places listings in Stoneham, Massachusetts
National Register of Historic Places listings in Middlesex County, Massachusetts

References

Houses in Stoneham, Massachusetts
Houses on the National Register of Historic Places in Stoneham, Massachusetts
Second Empire architecture in Massachusetts
Houses completed in 1860
Buildings with mansard roofs